Bulbophyllum macranthum (large-flowered bulbophyllum) is a species of orchid.

macranthum